Chan Fai-young (born 25 September 1970) is a Hong Kong Cantopop composer. Chan was born in Macau in 1970. He attended Berklee College of Music, an American college in Boston, Massachusetts.

Chan composed his first work in 1994, "Romantic White Paper", sung by Eric Suen Yiu-wai. He composed other songs, including ones alongside lyricist Lin Xi, sung by many singers. He and Lin Xi wrote "Ngaam Yung" for Faye Wong, released in 1997 as part of Wong's EP, Toy. Chan composed "Garbage" for Candy Lo, released in 1997 as part of Lo's debut EP, No Need... Perfection Is Awful.

Chan and Lin Xi wrote "K goh chi wong" for Eason Chan, released in September 2000, and "Prayer of a Young Woman" for Miriam Yeung, for which both won as two of top ten Chinese gold songs at the 2000 RTHK Top 10 Gold Songs Awards. Chan Fai-young composed other songs for Eason Chan, such as "Night Does Not Return" and "Coming and Going", and for Miriam Yeung, such as "Lifting Up My Head", "Knowledge of Wine Drinking", and "Firebird".

Chan and Lin Xi also wrote "Beauty for Life"—written for the 2001 film, Love on a Diet—and "Shall We Talk" in 2001 for, respectively, Sammi Cheng and Eason Chan. Chan and lyricist Wyman Wong wrote "Painful Love" for Joey Yung. These songs became three of the top ten Chinese gold songs at the 2001 RTHK Top 10 Gold Songs Awards. In 2002, "Beauty for Life" won the "Best Original Film Song" and earned Chan Fai-young the "Best Melody Award" at the CASH Golden Sail Music Awards. Chan composed other songs for Sammi Cheng, such as "Exchanging Tenderness", "Come Back to Me", "The Last Cry", and "How to Shed Tears". Chan composed other songs for Joey Yung, such as "Fear", "Tsaang Hei", and "Disfigured".

Chan composed "Vortex" for Cass Phang and Anthony Wong Yiu-ming, "Love Someone" for Hacken Lee and Kelly Chen, "Day and Night"  for Jacky Cheung and Sandy Lam, and "Loving Each Other Is Hard" for Jacky Cheung and Anita Mui. He and Lin Xi wrote "Single Man" for Leslie Cheung.

Chan and Lin Xi composed twelve songs for the 2007 album, 12 Faces of Women, sung by various singers, including Sammi Cheng.

References

Sources

External links
陳輝陽 新浪網 at Sina

1970 births
Living people
Hong Kong male composers
Hong Kong songwriters
Macau emigrants to Hong Kong
Hong Kong composers
20th-century Macau people
21st-century Hong Kong musicians
21st-century male musicians
Berklee College of Music alumni
Macau-born Hong Kong artists